Souvignargues is a commune in the Gard department in southern France.

Population

Sights
Remains of the feudal castle (13th-14th centuries)
Church of St. Stephen (Saint-Étienne d'Escattes), at Escattes, dating to the 12th century.
Ruined Romanesque church of St. Andrew (12th century)
Grotto of Bézal, inhabited from the mid-Palaeolithic Age

See also
Communes of the Gard department

References

Communes of Gard